The 2018–19 RB Leipzig season was the 10th season in the club's history and 3rd consecutive and overall season in the top flight of German football, the Bundesliga, having been promoted from the 2. Bundesliga in 2016. In addition to the domestic league, RB Leipzig also participated in the season's editions of the domestic cup, the DFB-Pokal, and the second-tier continental cup, the UEFA Europa League. This was the 9th season for Leipzig in the Red Bull Arena, located in Leipzig, Saxony, Germany. The season covers a period from 1 July 2018 to 30 June 2019.

Players

Transfers

In

Out

Kits

Friendly matches

Competitions

Overview

Bundesliga

League table

Results summary

Results by round

Matches

DFB-Pokal

UEFA Europa League

Second qualifying round

Third qualifying round

Play-off round

Group stage

Statistics

Appearances and goals

|-
! colspan=14 style=background:#dcdcdc; text-align:center| Goalkeepers

|-
! colspan=14 style=background:#dcdcdc; text-align:center| Defenders

|-
! colspan=14 style=background:#dcdcdc; text-align:center| Midfielders

|-
! colspan=14 style=background:#dcdcdc; text-align:center| Forwards

|-
! colspan=14 style=background:#dcdcdc; text-align:center| Players transferred out during the season

|-

References

RB Leipzig seasons
Leipzig
Leipzig